The Alaska Raptor Center is a raptor rehabilitation center in Sitka in the U.S. state of Alaska. Located on a 17–acre campus bordering the Tongass National Forest and the Indian River. The mission of the Alaska Raptor Center is to promote and enhance wild populations of raptors and other avian species through rehabilitation, education and research. Although the main patients are raptors, especially bald eagles, the center will take any bird in need of care. The Alaska Raptor Center receives between 100–200 birds a year, with many suffering from some sort of trauma. They have treated birds with injuries from electrocution, collisions, gunshot wounds, leg hold traps, starvation, disease and lead poisoning.

Many of their patients come from outside of Sitka and are flown in via Alaska Airlines or smaller regional airlines. The birds travel in dog kennels that have been covered to block out light. This helps to keep the birds calm when traveling. When an eagle is healthy enough, they will be moved into the Walter and Suzanne Scott Foundation Bald Eagle Flight Training Center. This is a large indoor area where they are able to fly, bathe and interact with other eagles until it is time for them to be released. Birds that are no longer able to live outside of human care are sent to zoos or wildlife centers throughout the United States to serve as ambassadors for their species. 

Some of the birds that sustained injuries that did not allow them to be released have found a permanent home at the Alaska Raptor Center. More than 40,000 visitors annually come to see the two dozen resident eagles, hawks, owls, falcons and ravens, who assist in the center's secondary function, public education. The most well-known resident is Volta, a bald eagle who suffered permanent damage after a 1992 collision with power lines. Volta has been retired from doing on-glove education programs and is now living with three other eagles in the Bald Eagle Habitat off the back deck of the Raptor Center. 

In 2014 the center expanded their programming to Ketchikan, Alaska. They offer educational programming to visitors from May through September, housing bald eagles, hawks, owls and falcons. 

The center in Sitka is open to the public and offers daily tours.

The Alaska Raptor Center is a private, nonprofit organization.

See also 
 Juneau Raptor Center

References

External links
 

1980 establishments in Alaska
Bird health
Buildings and structures in Sitka, Alaska
Education in Sitka, Alaska
Nature centers in Alaska
Ornithological organizations in the United States
Raptor organizations
Scientific organizations established in 1980
Tourist attractions in Sitka, Alaska
Wildlife rehabilitation and conservation centers